Philanthropy as a service (PHaaS) is a type of philanthropy in which charitable giving is managed through technology and donor-advised funds.

Overview
Typically, corporate giving is a centralized function, controlled directly by a CEO or a small foundation team of the organization.

The application of philanthropy as a service helps decentralize corporate giving by engaging employees and stakeholders, and empowering donors of any size. It is a software service that facilitates individuals to partake and structure charitable giving, without relying on other parties in an organization. The service providers offer charitable fundraising tools and administrative services as an employee benefit. They set up personal funds for employees in which the employees can put a percentage of their paycheck. As a result, employees are able to contribute to charities and causes of their choice, with employers providing tax-advantaged matching funds.

References

As a service
Philanthropy
Software industry